Xianing Bridge is a metro station on Line 2 of the Hangzhou Metro in China. It is located in the Xihu District of Hangzhou.

References

Railway stations in Zhejiang
Railway stations in China opened in 2020
Hangzhou Metro stations